Bina Tunas Bangsa International School (BTB International School) is a school in Jakarta, Indonesia.

The School is open to Indonesian and expatriate students with the dominant language of instruction being English, and Mandarin as a second language.

IB School 

BTB International School is an authorized IB World School.

References

External links

Official site

Schools in Jakarta
International schools in Indonesia
International Baccalaureate schools in Indonesia